Darul Uloom Jamia Nizamia Ghousia (Urdu: دارالعلوم جامعہ نظامیہ غوثیہ) is an Islamic seminary for Sunni Muslims. It was established by Mohammad Abdul Ghafoor Hazarvi, where he served as the Mohatmim and Grand Mufti. His son Mufti Abdul Shakoor Hazarvi took over as Mohatmim until April 2010. The Jamia is known for the great Ulama and Huffaz of Quran and Hadith it produced. It continues the tradition of the Darul uloom system initiated by Darul Uloom Bareily.

Academic disciplines
The Jamiah has the following division of studies:
 Nazirah-e-Qur'an (reading the Qur'an)
 Hifdhul-Qur'an (memorizing the Noble Qur'an)
 Tajweed and Qira’aat  (Quranic Phonetics)
 Islamic Law
 Islamic Jurisprudence – Specialisation in the Science of Islamic Jurisprudence and Research (Mufti)
 Hadith
 Tafsir
 Dars-i Nizami
 Mantiq  
 Islamic History
 Islamic Philosophy & Tasawwuf
 Arabic Language & Arabic Literature
 Persian Language & Persian Literature

The Darul Uloom has divided its education system into six major levels:
First level — Urdu; Persian; Arabic; Nahu-Sarf; Seerah; Fiqh etc. are taught along with the History.
Second level — Higher Arabic grammar; Fiqh; Mantiq (Logics).
Higher Third level — higher Fiqh and Usul al-fiqh; higher Logic; higher Arabic Literature; higher Philosophy; higher Islam History.
Fourth level — Hadith; Tafsir; Arabic and Persian poetry.
Fifth level — Six major Hadith Books: Sahih al-Bukhari, Sahih Muslim, Sunan Abu Dawood, Jami` at-Tirmidhi, Al-Nasa'i and Sunan ibn Majah are mainly taught.
Sixth level — further study in the field of Islamic Law; Arabic Language and Literature; Higher Hadith Study, Urdu Literature and Islamic Studies.

Library and publications
 The Jamia Library has a large stock of valuable books of Islamic history, Islamic philosophy, textbooks of different levels, journals, magazines etc. in Arabic, Urdu, Persian and Punjabi languages. It has about 22,000 books.
 Fatwa-E-Jamia: The Madrasah has responsibilities for issues of society. It gives accurate advice and legal opinions for those issues the aggregate of which are published as a book called Fatwa-e-Jamiah.
 The Jamiah publishes monthly wallpapers on Arabic and national language.

Facilities
All students reside at the madrasah. The Jamiah gives free education to all students and lends them textbooks. Students who attain an excellent result in the examination are rewarded. Moreover, the Jamiah provides 500 orphans and poor and distressed students with food and accommodation.

Notable alumni
Mufti Abdul Shakoor Hazarvi
Pir Allauddin Siddiqui
Moulana Asharaf Sialvi
Moulana Muhammad Maqsood Chishti
Sheikh Syed Abdul Qadir Jilani
Muhammad Tufail Naqshbandi
Muhammad Muneeb ur Rehman
Sarfraz Ahmed Naeemi
Sahibzada Haji Muhammad Fazal Karim

See also
 Al Jamiatul Ashrafia
 Manzar-e-Islam
 Al-Jame-atul-Islamia
 Jamiatur Raza
 Jamia Naeemia Lahore
 Jamia Al-Karam
 North Manchester Jamia Mosque
 Raza Academy
 Al-Mustafa Centre
 Manchester Central Mosque

References

Islamic universities and colleges in Pakistan
Islamic seminaries and theological colleges
Barelvi Islamic universities and colleges